Naughty Bear is an action-adventure video game released in 2010 for the PlayStation 3, Xbox 360, and iOS. Players control the eponymous bear as they use various things to earn "Naughty Points", with extra points being given for random missions.

The game is set in the 1980s, fictional paradisal island of Perfection Island, where teddy bears live in harmony. The main character, Naughty Bear, is a shabby teddy bear who has a tendency to be mischievous, which earns him the dislike of the other bears. Like the other teddy bears, he does not speak much but instead conveys his emotions through a variety of sounds and facial expressions. His actions are influenced by an unseen narrator with a demeanor reminiscent of that of a young children's television show host.

The game received mixed reviews from critics.

Plot
Set in the 1980s, Naughty Bear is the only bear on Perfection Island who is not invited to Daddles' birthday party. Naughty tries to be nice anyway and even crafts a gift for the occasion, hoping he and Daddles could become friends. When two other bears, Chubby and Giggles, see that Naughty has a present, they laugh at him. This makes Naughty sulk back to his house. He then decides to get revenge on the bears, going on a killing spree and punishing the various other inhabitants of Perfection Island and any outside help that comes to their aid.

The episodes that follow have Naughty deal with a variety of unusual events: fighting ninja bears to take out Mayor Chubby whose re-electoral promise is to kill off Naughty; battling the military to punish Cozy for using birds to spy on him; killing Nibbles for raising the Un-Ted; fighting his way through the Bear Emergency Action Response (BEAR) unit to kill oil baron Trembles for intending to kill Naughty and build an oil rig over his hut; and executing Fluffy for unknowingly threatening all existence while taking down his robot bear army.

In the seventh episode, a bear named Sunbeam makes contact with aliens. However, the aliens enslave the bears and take over the island. After killing the aliens and Sunbear, Naughty Bear is congratulated by the other bears for his effort, and is even offered a cake. However, Daddles smashes the cake in Naughty's face, humiliating him in front of all the bears on the island as they all played him. Heartbroken, Naughty Bear goes back to his hut, but not before he destroys the cabin all the bears are in with an RPG.

Three additional episodes were released as downloadable content (DLC). In the first, Naughty is invited to a cake tasting party to be the guest of honour. But learning it to be a trap by Cop Gordon as he calls in the superhero Danger Bear and his X-Bear team, Naughty not only punishes Gordon, but also the X-Bears and Danger Bear's number one fan, Bubble. In the second, Naughty punishes the crew of Captain Bear Beard and Giggles when they intend to dig up Naughty Bear's house for buried treasure. In the last one, Naughty learns the bears enlisted Vampiricorn to do their dirty work. Due to him and his minions draining the stuffing of Unibear, the vampire bears are almost unstoppable as Naughty punishes both them and Stardust, who came up with the plan in the first place.

Minimum Requirements

Gameplay

Gameplay requires the player to lead the single minded and sociopathic Naughty Bear on his personal quest to bring about hilariously brutal revenge against his elitist teddy neighbors. What follows so far appears to be akin to a slasher/gory movie that's played out through the eyes of the killer - albeit a stuffed and cuddly one.

Naughty Bear starts each level with a handful of weapons, a time limit and the goal of racking up as many "naughty points" as possible through the massacring of the local teddy populous. Points are not only awarded through the volume of kills but also partially for the creativity and elaboracy of the kills themselves. The real points will be made through tactical utilization of the game's fear-based multiplier system. Multipliers are earned through any act of naughtiness, such as a bit of vandalism or cutting the power to another bear's house. However, for the real points Naughty Bear will need to use terror tactics to really sow the seeds of chaos amongst his unwitting victims. This can be achieved through the use of traps, the presence of witnesses to particularly ridiculous executions or engaging in episodes of extended physical or psychological torture, the latter of which can lead the victim to blow their own fluffy brains out in order to escape the torment.

Naughty Bear features an online multiplayer that supports up to 4 players. The multiplayer is so far known to offer matches such as King of the Hill, Capture the Flag and Search and Destroy. Within a match a player's actions can either allow the recruitment of NPC bears drive them to tamper with the objective. Further details have yet to be confirmed. The multiplayer has a failure in connecting players with one another for Xbox live and disables most players from playing the multiplayer.

Development

The development team have stated that much of the inspiration for Naughty Bear came from Saturday morning cartoons; the idea of juxtaposing that innocence with dark humour and over-the-top violence.

The game's familiar mechanics were inspired by popular games such as Manhunt and Grand Theft Auto, Destroy All Humans, and the cancelled Campfire.  GameStop and Amazon offered pre-order bonus costumes that spoofed Jason Voorhees and Freddy Krueger.

In May 2011, 505 Games released Naughty Bear Gold Edition — which is the original game plus all 3 of its downloadable content episodes, 3 new weapons, and 4 new multiplayer modes.

Reception

The iOS version received "mixed or average" reviews, while the PlayStation 3 and Xbox 360 versions received "generally unfavorable reviews", according to video game review aggregator Metacritic.

The A.V. Club gave the Xbox 360 version a C−, saying, "Watching a psychologically tortured teddy bear blow his brains out is somewhat less hilarious than Naughty Bear seems to think. The “toys turned evil” trope is pretty warmed-over to begin with, so for the story of an ostracized teddy tormenting his cutesy brethren to succeed, it would need to do something more imaginative than nudge the boundaries of good taste. That burst of imagination never comes, so this thin game ends up trying to coast on a surfeit of charm it doesn't possess." The Escapist gave the PS3 version a score of two stars out of five and said, "Despite quite competently capturing the feel of a slasher flick and possessing a solid sense of humor, Naughty Bear is repetitious and clunky, and constantly feels like it's working to keep you separated from the parts of the game that are genuinely fun - that is, the hunting down and murder of adorable stuffed animals." Common Sense Media also gave the game two stars out of five, saying that it "just doesn't feel quite finished. The controls are horribly dizzying, and bad camera angles lead players to miss approaching enemies. While the premise of mixing fairy tales (which have a history of violence) with pop culture could have been compelling, this game didn't get the balance right. As is, it's a game that glorifies thrill kills without much humor and storyline." The Daily Telegraph gave the Xbox 360 version a score of three out of ten and said that it was "fun for about an hour.  It's not good, the virtually identical sections are hardly exciting, and there's a lot less variety in the mayhem than you might be led to believe, but it is an enjoyable, compulsive score-chaser. But it's deceptive. It lures you in with promises of something it never delivers."

Sequel
On May 31, 2012, a sequel was announced by 505 Games. Titled Naughty Bear: Panic in Paradise, it is a download-only game and was released on October 9, 2012 for PlayStation Network and October 10 for Xbox Live Arcade. According to Creative Director of Artificial Mind and Movement, Ashley Pannell, Panic in Paradise features a new gameplay style with no 'Top Hat' mode and covers thirty-six separate levels, across eleven individual locations, each with their own difficulty ramp and the ability to purchase enhancements with in-game currency to help progress through the missions.

References

External links
 
 Naughty Bear website

2010 video games
Multiplayer and single-player video games
Parody video games
IOS games
Xbox 360 games
505 Games games
PlayStation 3 games
Behaviour Interactive games
Video games about bears
Fictional teddy bears
Video games about toys
Sentient toys in fiction
Video games about birthdays
Video games about revenge
Video games set on fictional islands
Video games set in the 1980s
Video games developed in Canada